was a Japanese physicist.

Nosé is best known for his two 1984 papers in which he proposed a method to specify the temperature of molecular dynamics simulations. This method was later improved by William G. Hoover and is known as the Nosé–Hoover thermostat.

Publications

References 
Obituaries:
 
 
 "Nosé Shuichi, In Memoriam" by William Graham Hoover

External links 
 The recipient of the 3rd Science Prize of IBM Japan (Japanese) - Awarded for Nose's thermostat.
  - Some of notes of Nosé before his death are available.

1951 births
2005 deaths
Japanese physicists
Academic staff of Keio University
Kyoto University alumni